The 1960 Ole Miss Rebels football team represented the University of Mississippi during the 1960 NCAA University Division football season. In their fourteenth season under head coach Johnny Vaught, the Rebels compiled a 10–0–1 record and won their fourth Southeastern Conference (SEC) championship. Their only blemish was a 6–6 tie against LSU. Mississippi was the only major-conference team in the nation that finished the season undefeated on the field (Missouri subsequently was credited with an undefeated season when its lone loss to Kansas was erased by forfeit). 

The final Associated Press (AP) and United Press International (UPI) polls placed the Rebels second and third, respectively, behind the Minnesota Golden Gophers who were voted national champions before the bowl games. The major "wire-service" polls changed this policy following the 1965 season. The final AP poll of November 29 was one of the closest ever: Minnesota with 17½ first-place votes, Mississippi 16, and Iowa 12½. Students made “AP” and “UPI” dummies, hung them from the Union Building, and burned them while chanting, “We’re No. 1, to hell with AP and UPI.” The No. 1 Gophers, however, subsequently lost the Rose Bowl to No. 6 Washington. Meanwhile, No. 2 Ole Miss defeated Rice, 14–6, in the Sugar Bowl. Quarterback Jake Gibbs was voted the game's MVP by scoring two rushing touchdowns.

After the New Year's Day bowl games, the Football Writers Association of America (FWAA) voted Mississippi as national champions and awarded them the Grantland Rice Trophy.

Schedule
In the Egg Bowl, Ole Miss beat Mississippi State, 35–9. Ole Miss held the lead in the series with 29 wins, 24 losses and 4 ties.  In the Magnolia Bowl, Ole Miss tied LSU, 6–6. LSU held the lead in the series with 27 wins, 20 losses, and 2 ties.

Roster
E Johnny Lee Brewer
QB Jake Gibbs

1961 NFL Draft

Awards and honors
Jake Gibbs, Sugar Bowl Most Valuable Player
Johnny Vaught, SEC Coach of the Year

References

Ole Miss
Ole Miss Rebels football seasons
College football national champions
Southeastern Conference football champion seasons
Sugar Bowl champion seasons
College football undefeated seasons
Ole Miss Rebels football